The Clean Air Act was an Act of Parliament passed in New Zealand in 1972. It was repealed by the Resource Management Act 1991.

See also
Pollution in New Zealand

References

External links
Text of the Act

Statutes of New Zealand
Environmental law in New Zealand
Air pollution in New Zealand
Repealed New Zealand legislation
1972 in the environment
1972 in New Zealand law